Cahul may refer to:

Cahul, a city and municipality in southern Moldova
Cahul District, a district in southern Moldova
Cahul County (Moldova), a former county in Moldova
Cahul County (Romania), a county in Romania
Cahul (wine), a wine region in  Moldova
Cahul International Airport, an airport in Moldova, near Cahul
, a lake in Moldova and Ukraine
, a river in Moldova and Ukraine

See also 
Kahul (disambiguation)